This is a list of tertiary schools in Zamboanga City,  Philippines.

Universities and Colleges

A
 AMA Computer College-Zamboanga Campus 
 Ateneo de Zamboanga University

B
 Brent Hospital & Colleges Incorporated

E
 Ebenezer Bible College and Seminary

I
 Immaculate Conception Archdiocesan School

J
 J-Jireh School Inc.

P
 Pastor Bonus College Seminary, School of Philosophy
 Pilar College
 Puericulture Maternity Hospital School of Nursing

S      
Southern City Colleges

U
Universidad de Zamboanga
Universal College of Southeast Asia and the Pacific

W
 Western Mindanao State University

Z
 Zamboanga National High School West
 Zamboanga Peninsula Polytechnic State University (ZPPSU)
 Zamboanga State College of Marine Sciences and Technology (ZSCMST)

Zamboanga City
Universities
Zamboanga City